James William Lodge (11 January 1895 – 24 October 1971), also known as Jimmy Barrass, was an English professional footballer who played as a full-back in the Football League for Hull City and Halifax Town, and in non-League football for Cox Lodge, Scotswood, Newburn, Nuneaton Town and York City. He later worked as assistant trainer and specialist masseur at Hull.

References

1895 births
Footballers from Gateshead
1971 deaths
English footballers
Association football fullbacks
Scotswood F.C. players
Newburn F.C. players
Hull City A.F.C. players
Halifax Town A.F.C. players
Nuneaton Borough F.C. players
York City F.C. players
English Football League players
Hull City A.F.C. non-playing staff